Sofie Zamchick (born April 2, 1994) is an American singer, songwriter, actress and puppeteer. She is best known as the voice of Linny the Guinea Pig on the American animated children's television series, Wonder Pets!.  Zamchick attended the Experimental Theatre Wing at NYU's Tisch School of the Arts. She is a versatile musician and plays the marimba, guitar, piano, and various other instruments.

Zamchick grew up in Tenafly, New Jersey and attended Tenafly High School.

Acting 
Zamchick has acted and sung in commercials such as Kidz Bop, short films, television series, operas and in full feature films. As early as the age of 7, she had already appeared in three Metropolitan Opera productions and sang for Matthew Barney's Cremaster 3. The operas were Rusalka, Marriage of Figaro, and La Juive. She also co-starred with Whoopi Goldberg playing a cat named TJ on the Nick Jr. program, Whoopi's Littleburg. Other notable works include Priscilla, The Rape of the Sabine Women, Blood into Flames, and 89 Seconds at Alcázar. She was also featured in a Virgin Mobile commercial with musician Wyclef Jean.

Wonder Pets! 

Zamchick plays the voice of the main character, Linny the Guinea Pig, on the Emmy Award-winning television series, the Wonder Pets!. Linny often provides different zoological and geographical information to the others. Her catch phrase is "This calls for some celery!", usually declared at the conclusion of each adventure.

References

External links 

1994 births
Living people
People from Tenafly, New Jersey
Tenafly High School alumni
Actresses from New Jersey
Songwriters from New Jersey
American voice actresses
Tisch School of the Arts alumni